The Atlantic Coast Conference baseball tournament, sometimes referred to simply as the ACC tournament, is the conference championship tournament in baseball for the Atlantic Coast Conference (ACC). In 2017, the event adopted a modified twelve-team pool play format.  The winner receives the conference's automatic bid to the NCAA Division I baseball tournament.

History
The ACC has a history of odd formats for its baseball championship. Since 1973, the first year of the tournament, the format has changed six times. The current format is a four-group, three-team round robin tournament with the winner of each grouping playing in a single-elimination tournament for the semifinals and finals.

1973–78
See Example: 1976 Atlantic Coast Conference baseball tournament

For the first six seasons of the tournament, the ACC had seven members, resulting in a format where the #1 seed received a bye to play the winner of the #4 v #5 match-up. The first round of the tournament was single-elimination with the losers going home. After the first round, the remaining 4 teams played a traditional double-elimination-style tournament.

1979
Due to conflicts with exams, the ACC opted to not hold a tournament. Instead, the regular season winner Clemson was given the conference's automatic bid to the 1979 NCAA Division I baseball tournament.

1980–2003
Example: 1981 Atlantic Coast Conference baseball tournament

Beginning with the addition of Georgia Tech to the conference in 1980, the ACC began using a format closer to that of a true double-elimination tournament with a few exceptions.
The winner of the Winner's Bracket Quarterfinal match (Game 12) would play the winner of either Quarterfinal match of the Loser's Bracket (Game 10 or 11). The decision of which teams faced each other was determined by whether or not they had already faced each other in the tournament.
From TheACC.com:

If the winner of the Winner's Bracket Quarterfinal match (Game 12) loses in the Semifinal match (Game 13), that team will receive a bye and play the winner of the Finals match in a winner-take-all championship game.

1991–2003
With the introduction of Florida State into the ACC to bring the total teams to nine, the baseball tournament added a Play-In game where the bottom two teams in the conference regular season standings played in a winner-takes-all game for the 8th spot in the regular tournament.

2004

In 2004, the ACC began using a true eight-team double-elimination tournament with the bottom two teams in regular season conference play facing each other in a single-elimination game where the winner got the #8 spot in the regular tournament.

2005

In 2004, the conference expanded to 11 teams with the addition of Miami and Virginia Tech. Beginning with the 2005 Baseball Tournament, the tournament switched from a true eight-team double-elimination to two four-team double-elimination brackets with winner of each side playing in a winner-take-all championship game. The bottom four teams in conference play faced off in a single-elimination bracket, with the winner earning the #8 spot in the tournament.

2006

In 2005, Boston College joined the conference, bringing the total number of members to 12. Instead of adjusting the tournament yet again, the tournament would remain the same format as was developed in 2005, but the ACC eliminated the play-in round.

2007–2013
See Example: 2007 Atlantic Coast Conference baseball tournament

Beginning in 2007, the ACC developed a new tournament format that eliminated the brackets altogether. This new format was a two-group, four-team round robin tournament with the winner of each grouping playing in a winner-take-all championship game. Only the top eight teams in the regular season conference standings were invited to play in the tournament.
On July 6, 2009, the Atlantic Coast Conference announced a decision to move three future baseball tournaments out of Myrtle Beach, citing miscommunications with the NAACP concerning the display of the Confederate flag in South Carolina.  (Charlotte was included in the NAACP Boycott because Knights Stadium was in York County, South Carolina, less than five kilometers from the state line.)  The 2010 ACC tournament was initially scheduled to take place at Fenway Park, but cost-containment for schools (most of whom would have to fly to Boston) was cited for moving the tournament to Greensboro.

2014–2016
Beginning in 2014, with the expansion of the conference, the tournament expanded to ten teams.  The four lower seeds (7 vs 10 and 8 vs 9) played a one-game play-in game to participate in pool play with the 6 higher seeds.

2017
On September 14, 2016, the ACC announced that the 2017 tournament slated to be played in Durham, NC, along with neutral site championships for seven other sports, would be moved out of the state of North Carolina due to the controversial NC House Bill 2. On October 4, 2016, it was announced that Louisville Slugger Field in Louisville, Kentucky, would be the new host venue for 2017.

On October 6, 2016, the ACC announced that the tournament would expand to twelve teams and have a new format. The regular season winners of the Atlantic and Coastal divisions claim the top two seeds, while the remaining seeds are determined by conference winning percentage. The teams are split up into four pools of three teams each. The pools are a round robin format, with each team in the tournament guaranteed a minimum of two games. If a pool fails to produce a team with two wins, the top seed automatically advances. The four winners of pool play then advance to a four team, single-elimination bracket to determine the conference champion.

Champions

By year

By school
All current ACC members with baseball programs have appeared at least once in the tournament. Syracuse, which joined the conference in 2013, has not sponsored varsity baseball since 1972.

Italics indicate school is no longer a member of the ACC.

References

External links